Sher-E-Hindustan is a 1998 Indian Hindi-language action drama film directed by T. L. V. Prasad, starring Mithun Chakraborty, Sanghavi, Hemant Birje, Gavin Packard, Puneet Issar, Tej Sapru, Hemant Ravan and Gulshan Grover.

Plot
Honest police inspector Kranti Kumar takes charge of a police station in a small village where mafia don Choudhary Charannath and his gang terrorizes the villagers. Kranti takes hard steps against them. A village girl Naina falls in love with Kranti and after a while Kranti also reciprocates her feelings. A fight starts between Kranti and Choudhury's henchmen, and at last, Kranti defeats Charannath and kills him.

Cast
Mithun Chakraborty as Police inspector Kranti Kumar
Sanghavi as Naina
Gulshan Grover as Choudhary Charannath Lal Rai
Hemant Birje as 1st son of Choudhary
Tej Sapru as 2nd son of Choudhary
Gavin Packard as 3rd son of Choudhary
Puneet Issar as Police inspector Khulbhushan
Hemant Ravan as Kishan, Police constable
Madhoo as item dancer, special guest appearance
Kasam Ali as 4th son of Choudhary
Sagar Singh
Hemant Bhatt
Inder Khosla
Jeetu Gangavne
Laxmi as Kranti's sister
Lekha Govil as Kranti's mother

Soundtrack

References

External links
 

1990s Hindi-language films
1998 action drama films
Mithun's Dream Factory films
Films shot in Ooty
Films scored by Anand–Milind
Films directed by T. L. V. Prasad
Indian action drama films
Indian films about revenge
Indian police films